Galaxauraceae  is a family of red algae (Rhodophyta) in the order Nemaliales.

The type genus is Galaxaura.

The name Galaxauraceae was first published by Russian botanist Paulus Horaninow (1796-1865) in 1843.

The family has cosmopolitan distribution.

Calcification (while, chalky outer layer) appears in all members of the Galaxauraceae family.

List of genera
According to the AlgaeBase (amount of species per genus);
 Actinotrichia	 - 5 spp.
 Dichotomaria  - 20 spp.
 Galaxaura  - 25 spp.
 Tricleocarpa  - 8 spp.

Former genera; Alysium , Brachycladia , Halysium , Holonema , Microthoe , Pseudoscinaia , Spongotrichum  and Zanardinia

References

External links 
 

Plants described in 1983
Nemaliales
Red algae families